The 2005–06 season in the Honduran Liga Nacional was the 41st in its history and determined the 47th and 48th champions in the league.

2005–06 teams

 Hispano (Comayagua) (promoted) 
 Marathón (San Pedro Sula)
 Motagua (Tegucigalpa)
 Olimpia (Tegucigalpa)
 Platense (Puerto Cortés)
 Real España (San Pedro Sula)
 Universidad (Danlí)
 Municipal Valencia (Tegucigalpa)
 Victoria (La Ceiba)
 Vida (La Ceiba)

Apertura
The Apertura tournament was played from 6 August to 18 December 2005. C.D. Olimpia obtained its 19th national championship.

Regular season

Standings

Results
 As of 3 December 2005

Final round

Semifinals

Olimpia vs Platense

 Olimpia won 2–1 on aggregate score.

Victoria vs Marathón

 Marathón won 5–1 on aggregate score.

Final

Olimpia vs Marathón

 Olimpia won 3–2 on aggregate score.

Awards
Champion:OlimpiaAwarded 360,000 Lempiras
Sub Champion:MarathonAwarded 155,000 Lempiras
Fair Play Award:ValenciaAwarded 50,000 Lempiras
Top Goal Scorer:Francisco RamírezAwarded 30,000 Lempiras
Best Goalkeeper:Noel ValladaresAwarded 30,000 Lempiras

Squads

Clausura
Honduras Clausura 2005-06 is the closing season of Liga Nacional de Honduras, the first division national football league in Honduras. It followed the Honduras 05-06 apertura opening season. The winner competes in the 2006 UNCAF Club Tournament. The league games started 21 January 2006 and it finished on 28 May 2006.

Regular season

Standings

Results
 As of 7 May 2006

Final round

Semifinals

Olimpia vs Motagua

 Olimpia 3–3 Motagua on aggregate score; Olimpia advanced on better regular season performance.

Victoria vs Valencia

 Victoria won 4–1 on aggregate score.

Final

 Olimpia won 4–3 on aggregate score.

Top Goal Scorer

Squads

Awards
Champion:OlimpiaAwarded 360,000 Lempiras
Sub Champion:VictoriaAwarded 155,000 Lempiras
Fair Play:UniversidadAwarded 50,000 Lempiras
Top Goal Scorer:Luciano EmilioAwarded 30,000 Lempiras
Best Goalkeeper:Ricardo JamesAwarded 30,000 Lempiras
Most Valuable Player:John Ashton BoddenAwarded 30,000 Lempiras
Rookie of the year:José Luis GrantAwarded 30,000 Lempiras

Records
Highest fee paid:Victoria-Olimpia28 MayEstadio Tiburcio Carias Andino, Tegucigalpa31,951 fans2,997,750 lempiras
Highest Assistance:Victoria-Olimpia28 MayEstadio Tiburcio Carias Andino, Tegucigalpa31,951 fans2,997,750 lempiras
Lowest fee paid:Universidad-Hispano26 AprilDanlí 68 fans2,850 lempiras
Lowest Assistance:Universidad-Hispano26 April68 fans2,850 lempiras

Relegation

References

Liga Nacional de Fútbol Profesional de Honduras seasons
1
Honduras